Lidia Winniczuk (September 17, 1904, in Pidvolochysk – October 31, 1993, in Warsaw) was a Polish classical philologist, best remembered for her textbook Lingua Latina (1975).

References 

1904 births
1993 deaths
Polish philologists
20th-century Polish historians